Rachid Ferrahi (born July 18, 1985 in Oran) is an Algerian footballer. He currently plays as a midfielder for MC El Eulma in the Algerian Ligue Professionnelle 2.

Club career
On June 6, 2016, Ferrahi signed a contract with MC Oran, joining them on a transfer from JS Kabylie.

References

External links
 

1985 births
Living people
Footballers from Oran
Algerian footballers
Algerian Ligue Professionnelle 1 players
USM Oran players
ES Mostaganem players
ES Sétif players
JS Kabylie players
MC Oran players
MC El Eulma players
Association football midfielders
21st-century Algerian people